Calçoene River is a river of Amapá state in north-eastern Brazil.

In 1894, the river was at the heart of gold rush with there were 6,000 to 10,000 gold miners active in and around the river.

See also
List of rivers of Amapá

References

 Brazilian Ministry of Transport

Rivers of Amapá